Horisme tersata, the fern, is a moth of the family Geometridae. The species was first described by Michael Denis and Ignaz Schiffermüller in 1775 and it can be found in the Palearctic realm.

The wingspan is 31–36 mm. The length of the forewings is 14–18 mm. The moths fly in one or two generations from May to August.

The larvae feed on Clematis vitalba.

Notes
The flight season refers to Belgium and the Netherlands. This may vary in other parts of the range.

External links
The Fern at UKMoths
Lepiforum e.V.
De Vlinderstichting 

Melanthiini
Moths of Japan
Moths of Europe
Moths of Asia
Moths described in 1775
Taxa named by Michael Denis
Taxa named by Ignaz Schiffermüller